Shamkir District is one of the 66 districts of Azerbaijan. It is located in the north-west of the country and belongs to the Gazakh-Tovuz Economic Region. The district borders the districts of Gadabay, Tovuz, Samukh, Goygol, and Dashkasan. Its capital and largest city is Shamkir. As of 2020, the district had a population of 219,500.

Overview 
There are one city, Shamkir city; seven city-type settlements, of which include Chinarlı settlement, Dallar settlement, Zayam settlement, and Kura settlement; and 58 villages in the district.

There are 59 large and middle-size schools, 53 pre-schools, 81 secondary education schools, 1 technical vocational establishments, 22 hospitals and healthcare offices, and 156 cultural establishments in the raion.

Statistics

Population 

The population of the district is 192,900 people with 33.49% being urban and 66.51% living in the country. An estimated population density 113.49 person/km2. Men constitute 49.58% of the population, and women  50.42%. Children make up 11.26% of the population, while 33.18% of overall district population are residents below the age of 18, 57.86% are from 18 to 60 years of age. 5.79% have higher education, 56.1% have secondary education only. The number of refugees and IDPs from Nagorno-Karabakh conflict is 12,240 and 1,897, respectively.

History 

In the Middle Ages, Arab and Persian sources mentioned the city name as Şəmkür (Shamkur), Turkish sources varied from Şəmkür (Shamkur) to Şəmkir (Shamkir). Historian Zeynaloğlu who published a book on comprehensive history of Azerbaijan in 1924 in Istanbul he argued that name was translated as Şəms (Sun) - Kür (Rayed). 

Jahangirov explained otherwise referring to Şəm (Bank of) - Kür (Kür river), i.e. on the bank of the Kura River. The ruins of ancient Shamkir city which was in the form of a fortress and was 20 ha big is located on the right bank of the Kura river. The city had two bridges over Kura. In the 7th century the city was occupied by the Arabian Caliphate and was named Mütəvəkkilliyə. It was renamed back to its original name later. The times of prosperity of Shamkir are attributed to 9th-12th centuries when it was conquered by Seljuqs. In the 12th century when Shamkir was a part of Atabek Empire, special attention was given to the city. In the 13th century Shamkir was one of the main points of resistance to Mongol invasion. In the 16th century, the leader of local Zülqədəz tribe took the power. Later, Shamkir was part of Ganja khanate. In 1803, Shamkir was occupied by and annexed to the Russian Empire. During the Russo-Persian War of 1826-1828, Shamkir was one of the frontlines where Russian troops defeated the Persian army on September 3, 1826. In the first half of the 19th century, Russian Tsar relocated a large number of German colonists to Caucasus, placing a big community in Shamkir. From that time on until 1938, Shamkir was called Anino, after which it was renamed Shamkhor. It was renamed again to Shamkir in 1991.

Architecture monuments

Historic architectural monuments include 9th-12th century Shamkir city ruins, 9th-12th Shamkir bridge, 11th-12th century Shamkir  fortress in Muxtariyyət village, Baydar city ruins in Bayramlı village, 9th-12th century Maiden Tower in Seyfali village, 16th-17th-century mosque in Abbaslı village, 11th century Maiden Tower in Tatarlı village, 16th-17th-century bridge in Tahnalı village, 16th-17th century Koroglu fortress in Şəmkir, Qalaboynu Fortress in Atabəy village, Pir monument from early Middle Ages pertaining to Caucasian Albania in Daşbulaq village, a church built in 1909 by German settlers in Şəmkir, 11th-12th century Oghuz cemetery in Yeni Seyfali village, 16th-18th-century bridge over Zəyəm River.

During archaeological excavations carried out by a joint Azerbaijani-German expedition since 2006, ruins of an ancient Achaemenid palace were discovered near Qaracəmirli.

Among the modern built monuments are the Victory Complex built in 1975 in Şəmkir city, mosque in Düyərli village, Victory Complex in Çinarlı settlement built in 1980, memorials to Black January in Sərxan and Naxırçılar neighborhoods of Şəmkir city unveiled in 1990, Ashig Huseyn Shamkirli monument unveiled in 1991, Ali-Agha Shikhlinski bust, mosque built in 1992 in Keçili village, a 1993 Koroglu monument in Muxtariyyə village, bust of Azerbaijani National Hero, Zaur Sarıyev, Alley of Martyrs to people who died from Armenian occupation. mosque built in 1998 in İrmaşlı village, Heydar Aliyev spring built in 1998, a Memorial to Azerbaijani Genocide of March 31, 1918 built in 2001, mosque built in Əliyaqublu village in 1998, Memorial to Azerbaijani Genocide victims in Qapanlı village, a 2001 monument to Yəhyabəy Dilqəm in Dəllər Cırdaxan village, monument to Ashig Alasgar, unveiled in 1997 in Çənlibel village.

Government and economy

The Shamkir district is one of the largest agrarian districts of the Republic of Azerbaijan, covers 1660.00 km2, and the population is estimated at 213400 according to the official registration data in 2017. The major part of the employed population works in agriculture, industry, construction, trade, and public services. The basis of the economy Shamkir is dependent on agriculture. Poultry raising, cattlebreeding and silkworm breeding are major branches of agriculture. Agricultural machinery production, grape processing plants, construction plants constitute a big part of the economy. Wheat, barley, corn, grapes, onion, cabbage, tomato, cucumber, aubergine, sunflower, potato, viniculture, and livestock provide the main agricultural output. Electricity is received through power generation at Shamkir Hydroelectric Power Station on Shamkir reservoir which processes water from Kura River and also provides Shamkir and surrounding rayons with irrigation water. The new reservoir in the rayon will double that capacity and will come online in 2012.
2nd Shamkir Winery was established and operated in 1860-1896 by Christo Forer brothers and is active at the present. The total value of output in the economy of district during the first half of 2017 was around 219747 thousand AZN, and industrial products alone 22149 thousand AZN. During the first half of 2017, the volume of trade in goods amounted to 65,341 thousand AZN, and the volume of trade turnover increased by 17% compared to the same period of 2016 and amounted to 197030 thousand AZN. Total volume of gross product per person amounted to 315 AZN. “Sharg Ulduzu” Limited Liability Company owns a wine plant with 2000 tons of grape processing capacity, “Shamkir Poultry” farm producing 300,000 eggs per day, bread factory producing 55 tons of flour in a day, and “AzAqro” LLC which specialized in cultivation of Dutch cut rose varieties are the main industrial enterprises operating within the city. During the first period of 2017, through the National Fund for Entrepreneurship Support, 112,000 AZN state loans were issued to Shamkir region, creating 17 new jobs at the expense of these loans. According to statistics of 2017, 3149 jobs were created, of which 1984 were permanent and 1165 were temporary jobs. Shamkir Hydroelectric Power Station on Shamkir reservoir provides Shamkir and surrounding rayons with electricity and irrigation water. Municipality government was established in 1999. There are 57 municipalities in 64 populated settlements. One city, four settlements and 52 village municipalities function as regional governments The role of the municipalities expands as the renovation and city, village development, laying roads and development of social infrastructure continue.

Industry 

The industry of Shamkir region includes food, electricity and production of construction materials. The 8 out of 13 industrial enterprises were small businesses in 2016. “Sharg Ulduzu” LLC which has a capacity of 2000 tons of grape processing capacity, processes 9 varieties of wine products and also produces cognac alcohol from wine products. In the Shamkir district “AzAqro” LLC, a greenhouse complex, grows over two million roses in a year over 2.5 hectares land. Currently, the portfolio is composed of 14 varieties: Red Naomi, Myrna, Peach Avalanche, Avalanche, Candy Avalanche, WoW, Hot bubble, Be-bubble, White bubble, Alegria, Pany Lane, Luxor, Jumilia and Sweet Dolomite. Shamkirchay hydroelectric power station has 25 Megawatt power capacity and built in order to meet local electricity and irrigation water demands.

Construction

Agriculture 

Viticulture, grain growing, vegetable growing and livestock constitutes the basis of agriculture in Shamkir district.8. For the current year's harvest, in 14129 hectares of area grain were planted during autumn and spring in 2016. Its 8304 hectares were used to plant wheat, and 5777 hectares were for barley. High-quality vegetables such as tomatoes, cucumbers have been grown over the 906.7 ha greenhouse area in the district. There are total 5791 greenhouses which are heated by different sources: 285 natural gas, 637 of oil products, 2254 firewood and coal, 2811 are non-heated.

Sport 

As of 2014, the city is hosting Shamkir Chess tournament in honour of the memory of the chess grandmaster Vugar Gashimov.

Notable natives 

 Ahmad Javad, writer, author of National Anthem of Azerbaijan
 Farman Salmanov, famous Azerbaijani and Soviet geologist
 Yaqub Hajıyev, academician
 Fazil Mammadov, Minister of Taxes of Azerbaijan Republic
 Rustam Aliyev, academician and professor
 Zakir Abdullayev, geologist
 Eldar Məsimov, professor and dean at Baku State University
 Vaqif Seyidov, Surgeon General at Leyla Shikhlinskaya Clinic in Baku
 Leyla Bədirbəyli, famous Azerbaijani and Soviet actress
 Teymur Əhmədov, editor-in-chief of Republic newspaper
 Gülxar Həsənova, famous Azerbaijani and Soviet actress
 Zülfiqar Abdullayev, statesman and politician
 Davud Hajiyev, rector of Ganja State University
 Mubariz Gurbanli, deputy chief of Yeni Azerbaijan Party.
 Tajaddin Mehdiyev, former Minister of Defense of Azerbaijan
 Oruj Musayev, held managerial positions at the Ministry of Education of Azerbaijan Republic
 Paşa Qəlbinur, poet and dean of the Azerbaijan State Medical University

References

External links 
 Comprehensive information about Azerbaijan
 Shamkir District Executive Authority
 Municipality information system

 
Districts of Azerbaijan